Vladimir Kelekhsaev is a South Ossetian politician. He has served as the chairman of the political party Unity of the People since its creation. Although not Russophobic, he, and Unity of the People, are Russoskeptic, believing Russian interest in South Ossetia as simply a means to control the small de facto independent republic. He promotes a policy of economic independence and pragmatic foreign policy.

Political career

Unity of the People was created before the 2011 South Ossetian presidential election and Kelekhsaev stood as their candidate receiving 1,623 votes or 6.65% of the electorate. He did not advance to the second round of the election and endorsed eventual winner Alla Dzhioyeva. However, these election results would be annulled. Kelekhsaev did not stand in the ensuing 2012 South Ossetian presidential election. He would attempt to run for the 2022 South Ossetian presidential election, however, he would be disqualified from the ballot.

In the 2014 South Ossetian parliamentary election Unity of the People received 2,790 votes or 13.81% of the electorate and Kelekhsaev was elected to parliament. He would be re-elected in the 2019 South Ossetian parliamentary election. During his time in parliament he participated in diplomatic talks with Abkhazia. Following his re-election in 2019 he was named the Vice-Speaker of Parliament.

Kelekhsaev has also served as the head of the Java District.

Election results

References

South Ossetian politicians
Year of birth missing (living people)
Living people